The human gene SRD5A2 encodes the 3-oxo-5α-steroid 4-dehydrogenase 2 enzyme, also known as 5α-reductase type 2 (5αR2), one of three isozymes of 5α-reductase.

5αR2 catalyzes the conversion of the male sex hormone testosterone into the more potent androgen, dihydrotestosterone.

5αR2 is a microsomal protein expressed at high levels in androgen-sensitive tissues such as the prostate. The enzyme is active at acidic pH and is sensitive to the 4-azasteroid inhibitor finasteride. Deficiencies in 5αR2 activity of the can lead to a condition known as 5α-reductase 2 deficiency, which is a cause of 46,XY DSD that presents as atypical male genitalia.

See also
 5α-Reductase

References

Further reading